Drumin Castle is a ruined tower house near Glenlivet, Moray, Scotland. The castle is situated on a ridge above the junction of the Livet and Avon Rivers. It is a designated scheduled monument.

History
The lands were granted by King Robert II to his son Alexander Stewart in the early 1370s. It passed from the Stewart family to the Gordon family in 1490. The castle was abandoned in the 18th century and fell into disrepair.

References

External links
Drumin Castle web site

Castles in Moray
Ruins in Moray
Scheduled Ancient Monuments in Moray